Indonesian Idol  is a reality television singing competition created by Simon Fuller and produced by RCTI Production Team and FremantleMedia Asia, which began airing on RCTI in March 2004 and became one of the most popular shows in the history of Indonesian television. Part of the Idol franchise, it was as a spin-off from the UK show Pop Idol.

The concept of the series is to find new solo recording artists where the winner is determined by the viewers. Through telephone and SMS text voting, viewers have chosen 11 winners to date: Joy Tobing, Mike Mohede, Ihsan Tarore, Rini Wulandari, Aris Runtuwene, Igo Pentury, Regina Ivanova, Nowela Auparay, Maria Simorangkir, Lyodra Ginting, and Rimar Callista (listed in chronological order).

The series employs a panel of judges who critique the contestants' performances. The original four judges were AMI Awards-winning jazz musician Indra Lesmana, AMI Awards-winning pop diva Titi DJ, radio personality Meuthia Kasim and film director Dimas Djayadiningrat. The judging panel currently consists of musician, singer, entertainment producer, and impresario Anang Hermansyah, AMI Awards-winning, musician, songwriter, music producer, and television personality Maia Estianty, AMI Awards-winning pop diva Rossa, ex-frontman of Dewa 19 and pop-rock singer Ari Lasso, and runner-up of Indonesian Idol season 2 Judika. Other judges who have been a part of the show are radio and television host Indy Barends, MTV video jockey and actor Jamie Aditya, composer and conductor Erwin Gutawa, Indonesian Movie Awards-winning actress and pop singer BCL, AMI Awards-winning pop diva and also Indonesian-International superstar and performer AGNEZ MO, hits-maker producer Ahmad Dhani, frontman of Gigi Armand Maulana, and vocalist of Kotak Tantri Syalindri.

The show was originally hosted by radio DJ Amelia Natasha a.k.a. Ata and TV host Irgi Ahmad Fahrezy. In 2006, MTV Indonesia's video jockey Daniel Mananta replaced Irgi as the main host and singer Dewi Sandra replaced Ata in 2008. In 2010, Daniel Mananta was the only host for this program until 2012. In 2014, Pica Priscilla and Lolita Agustine accompanied Daniel Mananta respectively as the backstage host. In 2017, Sere Kalina with Daniel Mananta filled in as the main host. In 2020, actor, rapper, TV host and YouTuber, and also MTV Indonesia's video jockey, Boy William replaced Daniel Mananta as the main host.

The show has won several awards, including the 2005 and 2006 Panasonic Awards for the Best Music Variety Show. The show won over its popular rival singing competition show at the time, Akademi Fantasi Indosiar (known locally as AFI).

After the fifth season, the event was discontinued because of declining ratings, and resumed its sixth season in 2010. The seventh season was held in 2012 and rapidly became the most successful season in the history of Indonesian Idol. Originally planned to be replaced by UK hit The X Factor in 2013, both shows were still broadcasting on every alternating year.

In 2014, Indonesian Idol ratings decreased. And in the next year, precisely in November 2015, Indonesian Idol programs for the time being discontinued and replaced by The Voice Indonesia which were considered more popular in the world. However, due to the low ratings of The Voice Indonesia, RCTI announced in June 2017, that Indonesian Idol would return after a three-year hiatus.

Judges and hosts
The show had originally four judges, namely musician, instrumentalist, and Indonesian jazz icon Indra Lesmana, Indonesian pop diva Titi DJ, radio personality Meuthia Kasim, and film director Dimas Djayadiningrat a.k.a. Dimas Djay. In season three, radio and television personality Indy Barends replaced Meuthia Kasim because of Meuthia's health. Indy stayed only for one season and left the show before season four. In season four, MTV video jockey, actor, and radio host Jamie Aditya replaced Indy Barends and musician, singer, producer, and impresario Anang Hermansyah replaced Dimas Djay who left the panel after three seasons. In season five, Jamie left the panel and only three judges, Indra, Titi, and Anang were the judges. In 2010, Indra Lesmana and Titi DJ left the panel and replaced by composer and conductor Erwin Gutawa and Indonesian superstar Agnes Monica. Indonesian and Malaysian pop diva Rossa joined panel to be the fourth judge. And in 2012, Anang Hermansyah and Agnes Monica return as judges, while a frontman of Dewa 19, musician, composer, and hits-maker music producer Ahmad Dhani replaced Erwin Gutawa in the panel. In 2014, Titi DJ returned to the panel after an absence of three seasons. while Agnes Monica left the panel of judges and being replaced by singer and vocalist of Kotak Band Tantri Syalindri. Anang and Dhani still returned as judges. In 2018, RCTI announced all judges from last season would not be returned and the formation panel were changed from four judges into five judges. Pop-rock singer and ex-frontman of Dewa 19 Ari Lasso, frontman of Gigi and songwriter Armand Maulana, music producer and musician Maia Estianty, famous actress and pop singer BCL, and runner-up of Indonesian Idol season 2 Judika were all set for the panel. On the upcoming season 10 or called "Idol X", all the judges from previous season was confirmed to come back, except Armand due to his duties on another talent show, and being replaced by previous seasons judge Anang Hermansyah after one hiatus season. In 2020 season, BCL being replaced by pop diva Rossa due to BCL's mental conditions after her husband's death at the same year. In 2022 season, Maia and Ari being replaced by BCL, previous seasons judge and ex-frontman of Naif, David Bayu, new judge.

Guest judges may occasionally be introduced. In season one, guest judge was pop diva Krisdayanti. In season two, musician, music producer, composer, and songwriter Yovie Widianto replaced Dimas Djay and frontman of Dewa 19, musician, composer, songwriter, and music producer Ahmad Dhani replaced Meuthia Kasim in any cities audition. In season four, in several times Titi DJ replaced by comedian, actress, radio host, and singer Tika Panggabean in Spectacular show. In season six, alternately singer, songwriter, music producer, composer, and music arranger Melly Goeslaw, Ahmad Dhani, frontman of ST 12 Charly Van Houten, frontman of Ungu Pasha, and frontman of Gigi Armand Maulana were the guest judges in spectacular show.

Guest judges were used in the audition rounds for seasons five, six and seven, such as singer Rio Febrian, Melly Goeslaw, singer and songwriter Nugie, and Yovie Widianto in season five Melly Goeslaw, Ahmad Dhani, singer Hedi Yunus, pop-jazz singer Andien, and singer Nina Tamam in season seven.

The two season first was presented by Amelia Natasha aka Ata and Irgi Ahmad Fahrezy. Irgi quit after the second season and replaced by Daniel Mananta. In fifth season, Ata left the show and replaced by RnB, dance, and pop singer Dewi Sandra. Since sixth season, only Daniel Mananta was the host of this show. At eighth season, Pica Priscilla and Lolita Agustine accompanied Daniel Mananta respectively as the backstage host. At ninth and tenth season, Sere Kalina with Daniel Mananta filled in as the main host. Actor, rapper, TV host and YouTuber Boy William replaced Daniel Mananta as the only main host at eleventh season. But, when Boy William has tested positive to COVID-19 at end of December 2020 until mid-January 2021, Daniel Mananta returned to be guest host. When Boy has recovered, he hosted this show again together with Daniel, until Daniel really resigned from Indonesian Idol at end of January 2021.

Presenters
Key:  Current  Previous

Judges
Key:  Current  Previous

Winners

 Later, Joy broke her contract with Fremantle Media and Indonesian Idol. As a result, her place as the winner was granted to runner-up, Delon Thamrin.

Selection process
In a series of steps, the show selects the eventual winner out of many tens of thousands of contestants.

Auditions
There were 2 rounds of auditions which usually took place in large convention halls where thousands of people waited in line. The first round judges were the Sony BMG people. Those who pass the first round of preliminary auditions continued to audition in front of the Indonesian Idol main judges. Contestants were required to sing a cappella with poor singers often facing intense and humbling criticism from the judges. Typically the judges express disgust or dismay or suppressed laughter. Those who impress the majority of the judges, move on to the elimination round which take place in Jakarta. Usually only 150 to 170 contestants get through to the elimination round in Jakarta.

Contestants had to be Indonesian citizens . For the first season, contestants were required to be between the ages 18 to 24 years old. To increase variety, in the second and third season the age requirement was lowered from 18 to 16 and the upper age limit was raised from 24 to 28. As a result, there were many teenagers that made it to the final 12 such as Monita and Vira from the second season and also Tesa, Brinet, Christy, Ihsan, Gea and Dirly from the third season. For the fifth season, the eligible age-range for contestants were 17 to 29.

Elimination round
There were 3 elimination rounds. In the first elimination round, 170 contestants from around Indonesia were separated in 17 groups of 10 contestants. In the 2nd elimination round, male and female contestants were paired and sang duets. In the last elimination round the remaining contestants sang their choice of song alone in front of the judges. The judges then inform them whether they have made it onto the stage show or not.

Workshop Round

Season 1
In the first season, 30 contestants were separated in groups of 10 and every week three contestants from each group were chosen to the Top 10 or The Spectacular Show. Audiences vote their favorites by SMS and Premium Calls. After 9 contestants were chosen, there was a wild card round. Only one contestant from the Wild Card round could join the 9 contestants at the Spectacular Show. Karen Theresia Pooroe won the most audience votes, advancing to the Top 10. Although the spectacular show was supposed to have a set of 10 contestants, the judges announced at the last minute that they would be advancing a second wild card/eleventh contestant, Lucky Octavian, as well.

Season 2
In the second season, there was no Wild Card round. 24 contestants were separated into groups of 8. Every week, 4 contestants were picked to move on to the Top 12.

Season 3
For the third season, the workshop stage consisted of three rounds each for male and female contestants. There were 28 contestants that made it to the workshop stage on the third season. In the first week, eight contestants (four males and four females) were sent home. Six contestants (three males and three females) were sent home in the second week, and the final workshop eliminated four more contestants (two males and two females). Before the spectacular round, pre-gala and wild card show was held. Four of the eliminated contestants were chosen by the judges and two of them, one male and one female, were given a place in the Spectacular Show based on voting result.

Season 6
The sixth season saw several changes to the format of the show. There were 14 finalists instead of 12. On the Workshop round, 24 semi-finalists were divided into 2 groups. Each consists of 6 male and 6 females. Four contestants of each group got voted off in the first and second week, two in third, fourth and fifth week respectively until resulting the top 10 contestants who filled 10 of 14 spots on the Spectacular Shows. The judges selected 8 of the previously eliminated 14 semi-finalists to compete in the Wild Card round. Two contestants were picked based on votes by the viewers while the other two were selected by the judges. A total of four contestants (two males and two females) advanced to the final group of 14.

Spectacular Show
The Spectacular Show, which lasted eleven weeks, each finalist performed a song live (two in the top 4 and top 3 and three in the finale) in prime time with a weekly theme at Balai Sarbini Concert Hall in Jakarta in front of live audiences. Unlike American Idol, Indonesian Idol's Result Show is conducted about 1-hour after the Spectacular Show. For the Grand Final, the Result Show was conducted 7 days after the Grand Final. In the Result Show, some finalists who get the fewest votes are put in the bottom three or bottom two. Each week, finalist with the fewest votes is sent home. This process was repeated each week until the one remaining contestant is declared the winner.

Indonesian Idols famous sentence for the result is Indonesia Memilih! (Indonesia has chosen!/Indonesia voted...) along with a 1-minute pause and at last, the result. Every season, the two remaining finalists in the Grand Final sing a new single for the Winner's Record. The song is going to be recorded at the winner's album.

Season Synopsis

Season 1

The first season was conducted in 2004 where the auditions were held at five cities: Medan, Yogyakarta, Bandung, Surabaya and Jakarta. 32,000 people who auditioned for Season 1. The show became a big phenomenon after the grandfinale was watched by about 4 million people in September 2004. There were several people who sang off-keys on the audition who competed on 'Coba Lagi Awards' (Try Again Awards). The winner of this award became a guest star on The Top 11 Spectacular Show's Result Show.

The number of the finalists on the first Spectacular Show was originally planned to be 10. However, the judges then made a surprising move by picking Lucky Octavian to also get the wild-card ticket (the first wild card ticket was taken by Karen Pooroe) making the number of contestants became 11. Guy Sebastian who was in Indonesia for his album promo tour, came as a guest star at the Top 7 Spectacular Show.

Indonesian Idol released its first compilation album, Indonesian Idol: Indonesian All Time Hits. The album made a huge success and had a Double Platinum status. In the album, the Top 11 sang their first hit, Ekspresi.

Two finalists who battled at the Grand Finale were Joy Destiny Tobing and Delon Thamrin. There were 7,000 people who watched the show live at Istora Senayan, Jakarta. The soon to be Indonesian president Susilo Bambang Yudhoyono also watched the grandfinal. Eventually, the winner of the first season was Joy Destiny Tobing from Jakarta.

She signed a contract deal with BMG Indonesia, the partner of Indonesian Idol's 19 Management. Not so long after her victory, Joy released her first album, Terima Kasih (Thank You) including her new single, most notable as her coronation song, Karena Cinta.

After the show, the top 10 finalists (minus Helena Andrian who withdrew her participation due to contract problem) had a tour around Indonesia. They visited Bandung, Semarang, Surabaya, and Medan. Indonesian Idol Finalists were given the opportunity as the opening singers on American Idol tour in Singapore not long after the show.

A few weeks after the tour, Joy's contract with the show's producer, FremantleMedia, was terminated after some problems regarding terms of her contract.Joy: Saya Ditelantarkan. Retrieved 5 March 2010 As a result, runner-up Delon Thamrin was more heavily promoted by Fremantle afterwards.

After leaving Indonesian Idol, Joy made her first international album called Rise. Rumors said that Joy had been planning to resign from Indonesian Idol since the audition for her fame. Delon also took his first role as a movie star by starring at the movie Vina Bilang Cinta with Indonesia's famous actress Rachel Maryam.

Before Joy, Helena also resigned from Indonesian IdolHelena Tolak Tanda Tangani Kontrak Dengan IP. Retrieved 6 July 2010 and released her first solo album in 2005 titled Keajaiban Cinta. Nania, the second runner-up, and Karen also chose to resign shortly after Helena.

Delon's first album was released in October 2004 with the single Bahagiaku. His album also made a huge success. He was also featured in Indonesian Famous Singer, Andre Hehanusa,'s album with his single Aku Masih Cinta (I still Love You). Delon's second album was released in December 2005. Delon was also nominated as the Best New Singer in Anugrah Planet Muzik 2005. He also won a 2005 SCTV Award as The Best New Artist.

Michael Jakarimilena starred a movie about a Papua boy where he starred as one of the villagers in the movie. The movie was released in Indonesia in 2006. Winda Viska Ria takes a role at a local sitcom called OB Office Boy. Nania was featured in Indra Lesmana's album and sang Sedalam Cintamu (As Deep as Your Love) with Indra Lesmana. Adika Priatama has been working for RCTI as an anchor.

Finalists
(ages stated at time of contest)

Elimination chart

1 The first week of The Spectacular Show was a Double Elimination Week and four contestants were announced unsafe.
2 Due to having an appendicitis, Nania was absent on the Top 7 show, leaving the show with only 6 contestants. She was allowed to remain on the show proceeding to the top 6-week, but just for one week. Otherwise she would automatically be voted off.
3 It was revealed that the number of votes cast during the grand final week were approximately 4 million. Less than 6 percent margin separated Joy and Delon.

Season 2

The second season started on 25 March 2005. Auditions were held from 15 February – 17 March at five cities: Makassar, Yogyakarta, Bandung, Surabaya and Jakarta. The audition in Medan was canceled due to the tsunami in 2004 that destroyed most part of Aceh and North Sumatra. Then, as a replacement, the audition was also held in Makassar. There were 38,000 people who auditioned for the second season.

There were some changes on the second season, named there was no Wildcard round, and the number of the finalists on the spectacular show became 12. Nine male contestants made it to the top 12 and only three female contestants.  It is the only Indonesian Idol season to have a gender imbalance among the finalists.

Indonesian Idol Season 2 Compilation Album was released three weeks after the Spectacular Show began. The title of the album was Seri Cinta or Love Songs. The single album-hit was Cintaku, sung by Season 2's Top 12.

Two finalists that who in the Finale were Mike and Judika. The Grand Final was held at the Plenary Hall of Jakarta Convention Center. In the Result Show, some stars became guest stars, one of them was Christian Bautista a famous male singer from the Philippines. Ruth Sahanaya, Indonesia's Pop Diva, made a surprise appearance for Mike and Judika when they sang her song, Tak Kuduga. Season 1 finalists came to the Result Show and sang together with season 2's finalists.

The number of votes cast during the grand final week was the only 1  million. Mike took the crown by a slim two percent margin. It was that Judika led the vote before the Result Show, but finally Mike passed him and won.

Not long after the finale, he released his self-titled album with his new single, Semua Untuk Cinta (All For Love). Many great Indonesian Composers made some songs for Mike's first album, including, Cinta Tak Bertuan composed by Glenn Fredly. Runner up Judika had released his solo album in August 2006. The Top 12 contestants had a tour to Surabaya. The tour was initially planned to also go to Bandung, Yogyakarta, and Makassar. However, Fremantle canceled it without any published reason. After seven years passed, some of the finalists of season 2 were confirmed to go back to the music industry. Maya (now Kamaya) has launched his first mini album in 2010, Wisnu who'd changed his name into Nino released two singles in 2011, Monita who's placed fourth on this season has launched her first album in 2010 produced by the former judge Indra Lesmana. Also, he became the Judge since Season 9.

Also, Ronald Silitonga, Wisnu, Danar Indra and Top 8 of season 3 Sisi Hapsari have made a Christian group named Awaken which had mild success in Indonesian gospel music. In 2013, Danar Indra also confirmed to launch his first single: "Untuk Apa" (What For) written by Bemby Noor, who has written for Afgan and Girlband Cherrybelle.

In 2016, the public was shocked by the death of Mike Mohede because of a heart attack on Sunday afternoon. It became the most trending topic ever in Indonesian entertainment history, named him one of the best personalities in Indonesian Music. Weeks after, some winners of Indonesian Idol and finalists made a tribute concert and watched by thousands of fans.

In 2017, Top 12 finalist Danar Indra confirmed through his fan page that he would release his first Christian Contemporary Album and worked with the keyboardist of Tompi and Trio Lestari. In January 2018, Danar had signed a solo deal with an Independent Christian Label, and on 18 January 2018, Danar released his debut solo single "Tuhan Adalah Gembalaku." The single went exceptionally well in digital and became a fan's long waiting single after 12 years and started as the first Indonesian Contemporary Christian Artist in the millennial era (2010–2018). On 18 February 2018, Danar released his first debut album, "And I'm Dancing..." digitally. The album was influenced by his ups and down life, spiritual experiences, and Psalm 23. There are ten tracks, one of which is the international version of his first single, a duet with one gospel singer Maya Uniputty. Following the success of his debut album, he released a CCM recycle song: "Kau Sangat Ku Cinta," written by Franky Sihombing in an acoustic version. In 2020, Danar teamed with Jims Wong from The Voice Indonesia Semi-Finalist, releasing a sophomore single, "Rencana-Mu," featuring Viona Paays. The single was mastered under Nashville Auto Mastering in the US and got mild success as a new Christian Contemporary Song. In 2022, Danar teamed with a Christian Worship leader and former vocalist of Lifetree, Franky Kuncoro, to release a recycle song: "Pilihan Yang Terbaik," either studio and Live version, which aired on Revivo Channel. Danar is producing his new album: GREATEST STORY EVER TOLD, which is planned to be launched at the end of 2022.

Elimination chart

Season 3

The third season of Indonesian Idol was launched on 21 April 2006. The auditions were held at some Indonesia's major cities such as Jakarta, Bandung, Yogyakarta, Surabaya and Medan. This season, Indonesian Idols also conducted small auditions at some other cities such as Manado and Ambon. The contestants who passed the initial round in both Manado and Ambon were eventually brought into an elimination round in Surabaya. After an additional elimination round, the final group of contestants were finally brought to Jakarta to determine the final twelve contestants who made it onto the Spectacular Show.

As with previous Indonesian Idol seasons, the spectacular show was held in Balai Sarbini (Sarbini Building) located in South Jakarta. The Third Season's finalists were considered better than the previous seasons by the judges. However, there were some surprising eliminations going on at the Spectacular Show. Depe, who was regarded as a strong contender, became the first contestant to be eliminated. Indra Lesmana said that Depe was way too early to be eliminated. Sisi, who was a huge favorite amongst judges, got eliminated on the fifth Spectacular Show. The Final Three consisted of Gea, Dirly, and Ihsan. Gea's fans votes were not enough to safe her from elimination from the Top 3. This left Dirly and Ihsan to battle at the Grand Finale for the Indonesian Idol Season 3 title. The Grand Finale was held at the Istora Senayan (Senayan Athletic Complex) in Central Jakarta. The live audience who attended the Grand Finale was approximately 7,000 people. Kemenangan Hati, the winner's single for the third season, was written by Indonesia's top composer, Yovie Widyanto, who also served as guest judge at the Indonesian Idol's season two auditions. The grand final week had a total of approximately 2.7 million votes. Ihsan won with a margin of 10 percent more votes than Dirly

The third season also released a compilation album called, Tribute to Tonny Koeswoyo. Tonny, one of the founding members of Koes Plus, a legendary Indonesian Rock Band, died in 1987. Before his death, he and his brothers produced more than a few catch tunes that people still remember until today. The Top 12 Finalists sang Nusantara (Nusantara is the other name for Indonesia) as well as Koes Plus' other famous hit songs such as Diana and Kembali ke Jakarta (Return to Jakarta).

Since the show ended, Dirly and Gea have been seen debuted their acting career in a TV drama called Idola (Idol) which was aired on RCTI every Mondays on 8 pm. Ihsan also debuted his acting career in an Islamic religious series called Maha Kasih which is also aired by RCTI.

Elimination chart

Season 4

The fourth season premiered on 30 March 2007. Auditions began in early January. Ata and Daniel are back as fourth season's hosts. Indra Lesmana and Titi DJ returned as judges while Indy Barends and Dimas Djayadiningrat were replaced by Anang Hermansyah and Jamie Aditya. The fourth season's compilation album titled "Masterpiece" was released on the seventh week of Spectacular Show. The single hits was Bendera (originally sung by Cokelat), performed by the Top 12 finalists.

Rini Wulandari was named the winner of Indonesian Idol season 4 on July 28, 2007. She is the fourth finalist from Medan, North Sumatra who made it to the finale. This season was the first time since the first season where a female had won. The formation of 1 male and 3 females on the Top 4 is also exactly the same formation as in season 1. Rini's debut album was released in November 2007, which included her winner's single. Runner-up Wilson released his first single in March 2010. Fifth-place finisher Fandy Santoso, is now the lead singer of the band Kerispatih, replacing the band's former vocalist Sammy who was kicked out of the band due to drug use.

Elimination chart

1 It was announced the bottom two rather than the usual bottom three. Dimas finally got voted off after 5 times consecutively was placed in the bottom three or bottom two.
2 It was revealed that Rini got the highest number of votes. It also meant that Gaby got the second highest number of votes.
3 Rini got 51.2% of all votes which were cast in while Wilson only got 48.8%

Season 5

The commercial of season 5 was firstly aired during the Asian Idol's commercial break. Online registration was open on the Indonesian Idol's official website. Audition started on 3 February, starting in Medan. Daniel returns as the show's host, along with two new hosts, Dewi Sandra and Marissa Nasution. Ata is no longer the host because she moved to Australia with her husband. There were 15 cities which were visited for auditions. Eight cities which were opened for auditions are Medan, Manado, Ambon, Bali, Surabaya, Bandung, Palembang, Jakarta. Seven other cities, Yogyakarta, Malang, Madiun, Salatiga, Cilacap, Tegal, and Cirebon were visited by an Audition Bus that would tour around. A Dream Box was placed in The Wave Mall in Bali for auditions. The judges for the fifth season are Indra Lesmana, Titi DJ, and Anang Hermansyah.
The fifth season of Indonesian Idol started to be aired on 4 April 2008.

The fifth season (2008) is just finished airing on RCTI. This season the age limit was changed from 16–29 to 17–29.

The fifth season of Idol in Indonesia saw contestants able to perform with an instrument at any stage of the competition whereas other adaptations of Idol that have introduced live instrumentation only allow the concept at certain times during the show.

Elimination chart

Season 6

On 12 March 2009, RCTI's CEO announced that Indonesian Idol would not be running a sixth season. But in late October 2009, RCTI surprised its audience by showing a short commercial of the Indonesian Idol logo. Rumors started spreading that Indonesian Idol will be officially back in 2010 after a hiatus for one season. No press confirmation has been delivered to the media over the actual comeback itself. The judges for the sixth season are Agnes Monica, Erwin Gutawa, Rossa and Anang Hermansyah.

After many rumors, RCTI finally confirmed the return of Indonesian for Season 6, by making audition commercials that featured Daniel Mananta (who will be back for hosting), which confirmed that Indonesian Idol will be back in 2010. The auditions for Season 6 is going to be held from December 2009. Auditions were held in 17 cities. There was a form to fill in on the Indonesian Idol website to try for auditions for 2010. Auditioners had to be between the ages of 16 to 27 by 16 November 2009. The sixth season of Indonesian Idol premiered on 5 March 2010, on RCTI.

The sixth season saw several changes to the format of the show. There were 14 finalists instead of 12. Another change in the format, which was revealed on the fourth week of the Spectacular Show, is the one-time veto power for the judges to save a contestant who was eliminated by the viewers' votes.

Elimination chart

1 On 2nd Spectacular Show, 2 contestants must voted off

2 Starting from Top 10, the judges is might to use Veto Rights which the judges could rescue the voted off contestants. Veto Rights can only be used one time only

3 5th Spectacular Show postponed a day because the opening of 2010 FIFA World Cup on 11 June 2010

4 On 10th Spectacular Show, 2 contestants must voted off

5 Judges use their Veto Rights to save Ray from elimination

Season 7

RCTI confirmed the return of 'Indonesian Idol' for a seventh season, which aired from 17 February 2012, every Fridays and 8:00 pm.

The show, which was dropped the previous year for the launch of 'MasterChef Indonesia' made a comeback later in the year. In 2012, RCTI appointed Fabian Dharmawan to be the Executive Producer and a project leader for Indonesian Idol 2012, while Fremantle Media appointed Glenn Sims to lead the new creative direction and tone for the series.  Both Dharmawan and Sims worked closely to free the show of heavy-handed gimmicks that had bogged down previous seasons and to dramatically lift production values.  As a result, compared to all the previous seasons, this season of Idol achieved the highest rating and share in average and went on to become the most successful season in the history of Indonesian Idol.

Daniel Mananta who have previously hosted the show returned as the main host. The judges for this season were Anang Hermansyah, Agnes Monica, and Ahmad Dhani.

Elimination chart

Season 8

The eighth season of Indonesian Idol returned in 2014. This season doubled as the 10th anniversary of Indonesian Idol. The judges for this season would be Anang Hermansyah, Ahmad Dhani, Titi DJ and Tantri Syalindri. After a great success in producing X Factor Indonesia, Fabian Dharmawan appointed for the second time as the Executive Producer to lead this series. A little but noticeable different in picture quality in this series. Most of the outdoor scenes were shot in HD and most of the establishments were shot using mechanical heli cameras. Still using the same but slightly improved formula in producing, Fabian invests heavily in the judges chemistry and the raw talents of the contestants.

Elimination chart

Season 9

The ninth season of Indonesian Idol returns at the end of 2017. After the final year of Indonesian Idol, FremantleMedia presented a new breakthrough singing contest, namely Just Duet, created alongside NET. However, as both events had decreased ratings, RCTI and FremantleMedia brought back Indonesian Idol for the ninth season after a three-year hiatus. The judges for this season would be Ari Lasso, Armand Maulana, Bunga Citra Lestari, Judika and Maia Estianty.

Elimination chart

1 This season, the judges decided to not used their Veto Rights'''.

Season 10

The tenth season of Indonesian Idol returns at the beginning of 2019 after a one-year hiatus. Daniel Mananta and Sere Kalina all was confirmed that they will return for this season. The panel of judges for this season would be Ari Lasso, Anang Hermansyah, Bunga Citra Lestari, Judika and Maia Estianty. There will be guest judges for several city auditions. They are pop-rock singer and ex-frontman of ADA Band Baim, singer-actor Marcell Siahaan, singer Rizky Febian, winner of Season 8 Nowela Auparay, runner-up of Season 6 and pop-jazz singer Citra Scholastika, runner-up of Season 9 Ahmad Abdul, and finalist of Season 9 Marion Jola. This season was won by Lyodra Ginting and for the first time, the top 3 were dominated by the Girls. This was the comeback of Anang Hermansyah after a season hiatus.

Elimination chart

Season 11

That season was the one and only Special edition of Indonesian Idol. That season was held in the COVID - 19 pandemic. All of judges were back in that season, but it was Boy William's rookie season on Indonesian Idol, and tested, and as the result, he's positive, and replaced by the legend itself, Daniel Mananta, until he's recovered and Daniel Mananta was resigned from the show. That season was won by Rimar Callista.

 Elimination chart 

Season 12

The twelfth season is in production after Indonesia's Got Talent season 3 finale, with Pasheman'90 as the winner.

The cities that will be in the schedule of audition, as follows : Medan, Bandung, Denpasar, Yogyakarta, Flores, Kupang, Samarinda, Manado, Lombok, Malang, Surabaya, and Jakarta. The auditions are just begun on October 8, and concluded in November 13, 2022.

It will be the second season for Boy William to presenting this show.

And this is the first season that Maia Estianty will be the guest judge; meanwhile Ari Lasso take an hiatus, after been the judge for three seasons. Bunga Citra Lestari will be back, after her husband's death, which means this is the third season for her, and David Bayu, Naif vocalist, for the first time, joining the panel. And also six other names in the Indonesian music market will be join the panel. On January 16 and 17, will be hold the Showcases, before this round concluded on January 23 and 24, and the Top 15 begin on January 30. Spectaculars itself starts February 6.

Indonesian Idol Extra
A supplementary program that features news and updates about the Indonesian Idol contestants, highlights from the show, as well as exclusive behind-the-scenes coverage of Indonesian Idol. The show first aired in 2004.

Controversies
 Joy (The winner of the first season) ceased all ties with Fremantle Media and the Indonesian Idol franchise within weeks of her victory due to contractual disagreements between Joy and the show's management Indomugi Pratama. This included a six-year contract with Sony BMG and several appearance commitments including singing at local malls. Joy found this offensive to the Idol title. All traces of her Idol journey were removed from the official site.
 During the Workshop Round of Season 4 and Season 5, many contestants said "Saya sudah berusaha.." ("At least I've tried...") or  "Apabila saya diberi kesempatan untuk minggu depan, saya akan ..." ("If people give me the chance to stay here for another week, I will...") or "Apabila Indonesia memilih saya untuk minggu depan, saya...."("If Indonesia chose me for an aheading week, I...."'') when they received negative feedbacks from the panels. This stirred up some rumors among fans that it might have been scripted.

Awards and nominations

References

External links
 Official website 

 
2004 Indonesian television series debuts
2014 Indonesian television series endings
Indonesian reality television series
Television series by Fremantle (company)
Indonesian-language television shows
RCTI original programming
Indonesian television series based on British television series